Meijel is a former municipality and a village in south-eastern Netherlands.

History 
The village was first mentioned in 1303 as "Iohannes et Henricus fratres dicti van der Vloet de Meyele". The etymology is uncertain. It might mean "middle of the forest". Meijel developed on a sandy ridge in the raised bog of the Peel. It became a free heerlijkheid (no fief). In 1716, it became part of the Austrian Upper Guelders.

The Catholic St Nicolaas Church is a three aisled church with wide tower which was constructed between 1953 and 1955 to replace the church which was destroyed in 1944.

Meijel was home to 996 inhabitants in 1840. It was severely damaged during World War II. Meijel was an independent municipality until 2010 when it was merged into Peel en Maas.

References

External links
Official website
 

Municipalities of the Netherlands disestablished in 2010
Populated places in Limburg (Netherlands)
Former municipalities of Limburg (Netherlands)
Peel en Maas